Tomoplagia quinquefasciata is a species of tephritid or fruit flies in the genus Tomoplagia of the family Tephritidae.

Distribution
Paraguay.

References

Tephritinae
Insects described in 1835
Diptera of South America